Constantin Mihail Grigorie (born 1 June 1950 in Craiova) was the Ambassador Extraordinary and Plenipotentiary of Romania to the Russian Federation.

See also 
 Ambassador of Romania to Russia

References 

Living people
Ambassadors of Romania to Russia
1950 births